The 1978 Delaware 500 was a NASCAR Winston Cup Series racing event that took place on September 17, 1978, at Dover Downs International Speedway (now Dover International Speedway) in Dover, Delaware.

Background
Dover Downs International Speedway, now called Dover International Speedway, is one of  five short tracks to hold NASCAR races; the others are Bristol Motor Speedway, Richmond International Raceway, Martinsville Speedway, and Phoenix International Raceway. The track's turns are banked at twenty-four degrees, and both the front stretch (the location of the finish line) and the backstretch are banked at nine degrees.

Race report
Five hundred laps were completed on the paved oval track spanning . The race took four hours, eleven minutes, and twenty seconds to complete. Three cautions slowed the race for eighteen laps. Thirty thousand fans attended.

Bobby Allison defeated Cale Yarborough by 11 seconds. J.D. McDuffie won his only NASCAR Cup pole position  while using tires from the McCreary Tire Company. This pole position also secured a spot in the first running of the Busch Clash (now the Sprint Unlimited); Buddy Baker would ultimately win that race in February 1979.

Jabe Thomas would retire from NASCAR after this race. Bobby Allison would gain his 50th career Winston Cup Series victory from this race. Although McDuffie would never win a Winston Cup Series race, his best overall finish would come at the 1979 Sun-Drop Music City USA 420 in Nashville, Tennessee.

Notable crew chiefs who participated in the race included Darrell Bryant, Junie Donlavey, Buddy Parrott, Jake Elder, Joey Arrington, Herb Nab, Dale Inman, Walter Ballard, Kirk Shelmerdine, and Bud Moore.

Qualifying

Finishing order
Section reference:

 Bobby Allison
 Cale Yarborough
 Buddy Baker†
 David Pearson
 Darrell Waltrip
 Dick Brooks†
 Lennie Pond†
 Dave Marcis
 Donnie Allison
 Dick May†
 Ronnie Thomas
 Richard Childress
 Al Holbert†
 Cecil Gordon†
 Ed Negre†
 Earle Canavan
 Tommy Gale†
 Roger Hamby
 Nestor Peles
 Gary Myers*
 Frank Warren
 Buddy Arrington
 Baxter Price
 Nelson Oswald*
 Tighe Scott*
 Benny Parsons*†
 Richard Petty*
 Dave Dion*
 Neil Bonnett*†
 Ralph Jones*
 Joey Arrington*
 Jimmy Means*
 J.D. McDuffie*†
 James Hylton*†
 Louis Gatto*
 Ferrel Harris*†
 Jabe Thomas*†

* Driver failed to finish race 
† signifies that the driver is known to be deceased

Timeline
Section reference:
 Start of race: J.D. McDuffie had the pole position to start the event.
 Lap 3: Ferrel Thomas quit the race due to unknown reasons.
 Lap 5: Louis Gatto was black flagged due to unsportsmanlike conduct.
 Lap 10: James Hylton quit the race due to unknown reasons.
 Lap 11: Bobby Allison took over the lead from J.D. McDuffie.
 Lap 21: Cale Yarborough took over the lead from Bobby Allison.
 Lap 80: J.D. McDuffie blew his engine while driving at high speeds.
 Lap 98: Darrell Waltrip took over the lead from Cale Yarborough.
 Lap 99: Cale Yarborough took over the lead from Darrell Waltrip.
 Lap 110: Caution due to Nestor Peles spinning into turn two, ended on lap 112.
 Lap 140: Jimmy Means blew his engine while driving at high speeds.
 Lap 143: Joey Arrington managed to lose the rear end of his vehicle.
 Lap 213: Caution due to Ralph Jones' problematic engine, ended on lap 220.
 Lap 224: Caution due to an accident involving Neil Bonnett and four other drivers on turn three, ended on lap 230.
 Lap 238: Dave Dion blew his engine while driving at high speeds.
 Lap 243: Bobby Allison took over the lead from Cale Yarborough.
 Lap 269: The ignition on Richard Petty's vehicle stopped working, ending his day on the track.
 Lap 311: Benny Parsons blew his engine while driving at high speeds.
 Lap 318: Buddy Baker took over the lead from Bobby Allison.
 Lap 319: Bobby Allison took over the lead from Buddy Baker.
 Lap 320: The oil pan on Tighe Scott's vehicle developed some major issues.
 Lap 335: Nelson Oswald blew his engine while driving at high speeds.
 Lap 438: Gary Myers blew his engine while driving at high speeds.
 Finish: Bobby Allison was officially declared the winner of the event.

Standings after the race

References

Delaware 500
Delaware 500
NASCAR races at Dover Motor Speedway